National Route 301 is a national highway of Japan connecting Nishi-ku, Hamamatsu and Toyota, Aichi in Japan, with a total length of .

See also

References

National highways in Japan
Roads in Aichi Prefecture
Roads in Shizuoka Prefecture